Asia Rainbow TV Awards is an Asian television awards ceremony held by Hong Kong Television Association and China Television Production Committee. The first ceremony was held in 2011, and the second ceremony was held in 2014.

Winners are given the "Best" award, and runners-up are given the "Outstanding" award.

Categories

TV Drama

Programme 
Modern Drama
Historical/Costume Drama
Action Drama
Comedy 
Inspiring Drama

Individual 
Leading Actor
Leading Actress
Supporting Actor
Supporting Actress
Comedy Actor
Comedy Actress　
Director　
Scriptwriter　
Action Director
Theme Song

Entertainment

Programme 
Variety Show　
Infotainment　
Game & Quiz Show

Individual 
Host　
Hostess

TV Documentary

Programme 
Nature and Environment
Society and Culture

Individual 
Director
Cinematography

TV Animation

Programme 
Animation

Individual 
Character Design 
Director

TV Drama

Programme categories

Individual categories

Entertainment

TV Documentary

TV Animation

Special Jury Prize

See also

List of Asian television awards

References

External links 

Chinese television awards
Awards established in 2011
2011 establishments in China